Brandon Bays (born August 21, 1953) is an American author and motivational speaker. She has authored New Thought self-help books, and is best known for her 1999 book, The Journey, which became a bestseller in England and Australia.

She was born in New York City to an American father and a Romanian mother, who grew up in Vienna, Austria.

The Journey
The Journey is the title of Brandon's first book, The Journey (1999 and 2012). The Journey book has been translated into 23 languages. 

The book describes her experience of healing from a basketball-sized tumour, without drugs or surgery, in 6 weeks. 

Ultimately, she attributes her healing to 4 key elements:

 Gaining access to the 'cellular memory' where the trauma associated with the tumour was stored
 Forgiveness of the circumstances surrounding the trauma. 
 Accessing 'Source' / her own soul / infinite intelligence / Purusha.
 Feeling the emotions associated with the trauma, as a gateway into the direct experience of Source.

Based on these experiences, she pioneered a healing methodology that combines all four elements of healing. The Journey method is designed to help individuals access and resolve the root cause of longstanding difficulties – emotional or physical.

The Journey Method

The Journey is also the name of the healing method Brandon developed. This method is currently taught in 44 countries via live online workshops.

Education and career
As she writes in The Journey book:
Brandon Bays studied at University
Her informal studies included naturopathy, iridology, philosophy, storytelling, among other things. 
Together with a group of colleagues, she volunteered at a free-of-charge clinic in New York City which provided alternative treatments to people with terminal illness and no other options from the medical profession. 
She worked for Tony Robbins for 10 years, presenting the Living Health program as a Master Trainer.

Spiritual life

Brandon was deeply influenced by a spiritual teacher she fondly calls 'Papaji' ( H. W. L. Poonjaji ) whom she met in Lucknow, India in the early 90s. Papaji was a teacher of self inquiry in the tradition of the sage, Ramana Maharshi.

Personal life

Brandon's first husband, Dr. Bob (Robert) Bays was also a former Head Trainer for Tony Robbins. 
In the 1990s, Brandon and Bob lived on the beach in Malibu and lost everything when flames from the Californian brushfires leapt over the 6 lane highway and burned their house down. 

Brandon lives in Greece with her second husband, Kevin Billet, who is co-director of The Journey and the primary author of Light in The Heart of Darkness: The Surprising Truth About Depression & How To Free Yourself Completely from its Grips, which Brandon Bays co-authored.

Bibliography

References

External links

Motivational Speaker

1953 births
Living people
American motivational speakers
American motivational writers
American self-help writers
American spiritual writers
American people of Romanian descent
New Thought writers